Palpimanidae, also known as palp-footed spiders, is a family of araneomorph spiders first described by Tamerlan Thorell in 1890. They are widely distributed throughout the tropical and subtropical regions of the world, the Mediterranean and one in Uzbekistan, but not Australia. They are not common and there is a high degree of endemism.

Description 

The most obvious features of the Palpimanidae are the front legs, which are disproportionately powerful and heavily sclerotised. The abdomen is round to oval, evenly sprinkled with short straight hairs that in some species are sufficiently dense to form a close-fitting coat, though most species look nearly smooth. Usually the cephalothorax is somewhat less obviously hairy. The abdomen is evenly rounded without conspicuous sculpting, and in many species is elongated into an olive shape twice as long as the cephalothorax, giving the spider a vaguely torpedo-shaped appearance. 
Instead of having six spinnerets like most spiders, the Palpimanidae have only two. 
Colour patterns generally are subdued and simple. A few genera, such as Diaphorocellus have light patches on a dark abdomen. Most others are brownish or reddish to dark in general colour, but as a rule the cephalothorax is more heavily sclerotised and darker than the abdomen, as well as glossier. 
There are eight eyes in two rows of four, but in some species the outer anterior and posterior eyes are close together, which has caused some people to think there are just six eyes. In some species the chelicerae have stimulatory organs, microscopic ridges, with pegs that scrape over them when they rub the chelicerae together. The probable function is to signal to each other in mating, though it might have some defensive role as well.

Biology
The behaviour of the Palpimanidae is in general poorly investigated. All species produce ecribellate silk. They certainly are ground dwellers and do not spin webs, though they many do spin shelters for themselves in holes or under rocks. Palpimanus gibbulus at least, lives in leaf litter or under stones in dry soils. Many or most species go wandering at night, either hunting or seeking mates. They generally keep their very strong first legs held up in front of themselves while walking slowly at night, and on encountering possible prey they may feel it gently before grabbing it very rapidly and powerfully, as shown in some on-line video material.

Genera

, the World Spider Catalog accepts the following genera:

Anisaedus Simon, 1893 — Tanzania, South America
Badia Roewer, 1961 — Senegal
Boagrius Simon, 1893 — Tanzania, Malaysia, Indonesia
Chedima Simon, 1873 — Morocco
Chedimanops Zonstein & Marusik, 2017 — Congo
Diaphorocellus Simon, 1893 — Africa
Fernandezina Birabén, 1951 — South America
Hybosida Simon, 1898 — Seychelles
Hybosidella Zonstein & Marusik, 2017 — Cameroon
Ikuma Lawrence, 1938 — Namibia
Levymanus Zonstein & Marusik, 2013 — Israel, Saudi Arabia, United Arab Emirates
Notiothops Platnick, Grismado & Ramírez, 1999 — Chile
Otiothops MacLeay, 1839 — Caribbean, South America, Panama, India
Palpimanus Dufour, 1820 — Asia, Africa, Argentina, Europe
Sarascelis Simon, 1887 — Africa, Singapore
Scelidocteus Simon, 1907 — Africa
Scelidomachus Pocock, 1899 — Yemen
Steriphopus Simon, 1887 — Asia, Seychelles

Fossil genera 

 Cretapalpus Downen & Selden, 2021, Crato Formation, Brazil, Early Cretaceous (Aptian)

See also
 List of Palpimanidae species

References

Further reading
 Platnick, N.I. (1975): A revision of the palpimanid spiders of the new subfamily Otiothopinae (Araneae, Palpimandae). American Museum Novitates 2562. PDF - Abstract - 
 Platnick, N.I. (1978): A new Otiothops from Colombia (Araneae, Palpimanidae). J. Arachnol. 5: 179-180. PDF (O. kochalkai)
 Platnick, N.I. (1985): On the Chilean spiders of the family Palpimanidae (Arachnida, Araneae). J. Arachnol. 13: 399-400. PDF
 Platnick, N.I., Grismado, C.J. & Ramírez, M.J. (1999): On the genera of the spider subfamily Otiothopinae (Araneae, Palpimanidae). American Museum Novitates 3257. PDF - Abstract - 
 Grismado, C.J. (2002): Palpimanid spiders from Guyana: New species of the genera Fernandezina and Otiothops (Araneae, Palpimanidae, Otiothopinae). Iheringia, Sér. Zool. 92: 3. PDF - HTML -

External links

 Picture of Palpimanus gibbulus

 
Araneomorphae families